DNA primase small subunit is an enzyme that in humans is encoded by the PRIM1 gene.

The replication of DNA in eukaryotic cells is carried out by a complex chromosomal replication apparatus, in which DNA polymerase alpha and primase are two key enzymatic components. Primase, which is a heterodimer of a small subunit and a large subunit, synthesizes small RNA primers for the Okazaki fragments made during discontinuous DNA replication. The protein encoded by this gene is the small, 49 kDa primase subunit.

References

Further reading

External links